Broidy may refer to:

People with the surname
Elliott Broidy, American venture capitalist.
Samuel Broidy, known as Steve Broidy (1905–1991), American film executive and producer.
William F. Broidy (1915–1959), American film and television producer.